North Lakewood is a neighborhood in Snohomish County, Washington, United States. It is located west of Arlington, east of Lake Goodwin, and north of the Tulalip Indian Reservation. North Lakewood is considered part of greater Smokey Point.

Name 

Called "Lakewood" since the turn of the 20th century, the name was changed after the Pierce County community of the same name incorporated into the City of Lakewood in 1996.  This soon created confusion with mail service, as there were now two communities sharing the name. To alleviate this problem, in 1998 the United States Postal Service granted the Pierce County community the rights to use "Lakewood, Washington", since it was now an incorporated city, and changed the Snohomish County community's name to "North Lakewood", which was unincorporated at the time. This allowed the Snohomish County community to keep its post office. Since 2005, the portion of North Lakewood located inside the urban growth boundary has been part of the City of Marysville.

Education 

The Lakewood School District serves the North Lakewood community. Its main office is located at 17110 16th Dr. NE. The district currently has one high school (Lakewood High School, originally built in 1983, replaced/reopened in 2017), one middle school (Lakewood Middle School), and three elementary schools (Lakewood Elementary, opened in 1958; English Crossing Elementary, opened in 1995; Cougar Creek Elementary, opened in 2003).

Commerce 

Lakewood is primarily rural in nature, but suburban development near Interstate 5 has brought retail centers to that area. The largest of these is Lakewood Crossing.

Transportation 
North Lakewood has one major road, Lakewood Road, which is also called 172nd Street and State Route 531.

Here is a list of major streets that go through Lakewood:
State Route 531
11th Avenue
Forty-Five Road
27th Avenue NE
Twin Lakes Avenue
Freestad RD
Interstate 5, which is the community's eastern boundary.

References

External links

Washington State Department of Transportation projects
SR 531 Loop Ramp
SR 531 Sidewalks
Lakewood Crossing

Neighborhoods in Washington (state)
Populated places in Snohomish County, Washington